Ashley Klein is an Australian rugby league referee.

Klein refereed in England, beginning in the Rugby League Conference.

His first professional game was Workington Town v Featherstone Rovers on 8 September 2002. His first Super League game was Huddersfield Giants v Wakefield Trinity Wildcats on 15 June 2003.
In 2006 Klein was named by the Rugby League International Federation as referee of the year.
Klein was in charge of the 2008 Rugby League World Cup Final in Australia.
He quit Super League in 2009 to return to Australia, to rejoin his wife and children there.

Klein is a former Parramatta Eels junior referee. He is the son of former Penrith player John Klein.

On 17 February 2012 Klein was the referee for the 2012 World Club Challenge match between Leeds Rhinos and Manly Sea Eagles at the Headingley Carnegie Stadium in Leeds which saw the English side win 26-12.
On 19 April 2013 he was the referee for the 2013 Anzac Test.

As of June 2022, Klein has refereed ten State of Origin games.

Klein refereed the final of the 2021 Rugby League World Cup in England.

References

External links
Ashley Klein on the RFL website

1979 births
Living people
Australian rugby league referees
National Rugby League referees
Rugby League World Cup referees
21st-century Australian people